State Highway 100 (SH 100) is a Texas state highway that runs  between "Russeltown" and Port Isabel.  It was designated in 1926 along its current route. Its western terminus is at Interstate 69E/U.S. Highway 77/83 and ends at the western end of the Queen Isabella Memorial Causeway at Port Isabel. The route continues as Texas Park Road 100 east and north to a dead end on South Padre Island.

History
SH 100 was designated on September 15, 1924 on most of its current routing in Deep South Texas, but it ended at Gomez Street in Port Isabel. Since its initial construction, the only two changes in the routing was on January 23, 1975, when SH 100 was extended east 0.5 miles replacing the  section of PR 100 from Gomez Street to the western end of the Queen Isabella Causeway, and that SH 100 was rerouted the city of Port Isabel, where the route was transferred to separate one way surface streets to better handle flow onto the Queen Isabella Causeway

Route description

SH 100 begins at an intersection with Interstate 69E/U.S. Route 77/U.S. Route 83 and Farm to Market Road 1421 at unincorporated Russelltown (formerly known as Barreda).  The route travels due east, passing through downtown Los Fresnos.  The route continues east before turning northeast where it formerly met Old Port Isabel Road, which connected Brownsville and Port Isabel.  At this point the route becomes a 4-lane divided highway.  The route continues northeast and east around the northern edge of Bahia Grande before reaching the southmost edge of Laguna Vista.  The route then turns southeast, running along the coast of the Laguna Madre.  Continuing southeast, it passes through the town of Laguna Heights, before reaching the city of Port Isabel.  It reaches its eastern terminus at the Queen Isabella Causeway, which continues across the Laguna Madre to South Padre Island as Texas Park Road 100.

Junction list

References

100
Transportation in Cameron County, Texas